The Shengtian Park is a park in Nangan Township, Lienchiang County, Taiwan.

History
The park features the Shengtian Pavilion which was constructed in 1990 by the Republic of China Armed Forces. In 2004, the pavilion was rebuilt by the Matsu National Scenic Area Administration because it was weakened by the nature.

Geology
The park is located at the western slope of Mount Yuntai. It spans over an area of more than 10 hectares. The park is surrounded by Zelkova forest.

See also
 List of parks in Taiwan

References

Geography of Lienchiang County
Nangang Township
Parks in Taiwan
Tourist attractions in Lienchiang County